Materials Research Innovations is a scientific journal published by Maney Publishing. It covers all areas of Materials Research.

Indexing 
The journal is indexed in :
 Scopus

References

External links 
 

Taylor & Francis academic journals
Materials science journals